Sinner or Saint is a 2011 Philippine television drama series broadcast by GMA Network. Directed by Don Michael Perez, it stars Dennis Trillo, Bianca King, Alessandra De Rossi and Polo Ravales. It premiered on June 13, 2011 on the network's Dramarama sa Hapon line up replacing Nita Negrita. The series concluded on October 7, 2011 with a total of 84 episodes. It was replaced by Ikaw Lang ang Mamahalin in its timeslot.

Cast and characters

Lead cast
 Dennis Trillo as Raul Marcelo
 Bianca King as Noemi Manansala
 Alessandra De Rossi as Corrine Quisumbing 
 Polo Ravales as Alvin

Supporting cast
 Divina Valencia as Doña Faustina
 Matthew Mendoza as Armand
 Timmy Cruz as Sally
 Jenine Desiderio as Celeste
 Derrick Monasterio as Santi
 Joey Paras as Gerdo "Gigi" Mana
 Kim Rodriguez as Lourdes
 Djanin Cruz as Ikang
 Glenda Garcia as Tiling
 Dexter Doria as Yvette
 Archie Adamos as Tiago
 Jay Gonzaga as Albert
 Gretchen Espina as Sarah 
 Eunice Lagusad as Chona

Guest cast
 Daniella Amable as young Noemi
 Miguel Tanfelix as young Raul
 Chanda Romero as Racquel

Production
Actress Iza Calzado was initially hired for the series, for the role of Noemi Manansala. She was later replaced by Bianca King.

Ratings
According to AGB Nielsen Philippines' Mega Manila household television ratings, the pilot episode of Sinner or Saint earned a 13.6% rating.
While the final episode scored a 21.6% rating.

Accolades

References

External links
 

2011 Philippine television series debuts
2011 Philippine television series endings
Filipino-language television shows
GMA Network drama series
Television shows set in the Philippines